Gary Kirsten is a former international cricketer who represented South Africa between 1993 and 2004.  A left-handed batsman who primarily played as an opener, Kirsten took part in 101 Test matches and 185 One Day Internationals (ODIs) for his country and scored centuries (100 or more runs in a single innings) on 21 and 13 occasions respectively.

Kirsten made both his Test and ODI debuts against Australia in December 1993. He made his first Test century in November 1995, when he scored 110 against England. A year later Kirsten made centuries in both innings of a Test when he scored 102 and 133 in the second Test of the 1996–97 series against India. He achieved his highest Test score in 1999, when he made 275 against England in Durban. In an attempt to prevent South Africa from losing the match, he batted for almost 14 hours, spread across the last three of the match's five days. The innings remains the second-longest by any batsman in Test cricket in terms of time span, behind an innings of over 16 hours recorded by Hanif Mohammad for Pakistan in 1958. His most prolific series was against England in 2003, when he made 462 runs at an average of 66.00 including two centuries. His accomplishments with the bat during the season led to him being named as one of the five Wisden Cricketers of the Year the following year. As of June 2015, Kirsten is joint fourth in the list of leading Test century-makers for South Africa with AB de Villiers, and his total of three double centuries for the team is exceeded only by the four recorded by Graeme Smith. He scored centuries against all nine other teams which held Test match status at the time, and was the first player to score a hundred against every other active Test-playing nation.

Kirsten's first ODI century came against Australia in January 1994 in the first match of the best-of-three final of the Tri-nation tournament.  His highest score in ODI cricket came against the United Arab Emirates during the 1996 Cricket World Cup when he scored 188 not out. As of November 2016, this is the highest one-day figure recorded by a South African and the third-highest in the World Cup by any batsman. In ODIs he was most successful against India, accumulating four centuries. South Africa lost only one of the thirteen matches in which Kirsten scored a century. As of November 2016, he is thirtieth among all-time century makers, and sixth in the equivalent list for South Africa.

Key

Test cricket centuries

One Day International centuries

Notes

References 

South African cricket lists
Kirsten, Gary